In Italian folklore, the Befana is an old woman who delivers gifts to children throughout Italy on Epiphany Eve (the night of January 5) in a similar way to Santa Claus or the Three Magi Kings.

A popular belief is that her name derives from the Feast of Epiphany. In popular folklore, the Befana visits all the children of Italy on the eve of the Feast of the Epiphany to fill their socks with candy and presents if they are good, or a lump of coal or dark candy if they are bad. In many poorer parts of Italy and in particular rural Sicily, a stick in a stocking was placed instead of coal.  Being a good housekeeper, many say she will sweep the floor before she leaves. To some the sweeping means the sweeping away of the problems of the year.  The child's family typically leaves a small glass of wine and a plate with a few morsels of food, often regional or local, for the Befana.

She is usually portrayed as a hag riding a broomstick through the air wearing a black shawl and is covered in soot because she enters the children's houses through the chimney. She is often smiling and carries a bag or hamper filled with candy, gifts, or both.

Legend
Christian legend had it that Befana was approached by the biblical magi, also known as the Three Wise Men (or the three kings) a few days before the birth of the Infant Jesus. They asked for directions to where the Son of God was, as they had seen his star in the sky, but she did not know. She provided them with shelter for a night, as she was considered the best housekeeper in the village, with the most pleasant home. The magi invited her to join them on the journey to find the baby Jesus, but she declined, stating she was too busy with her housework. Later, La Befana had a change of heart, and tried to search out the astrologers and Jesus. That night she was not able to find them, so to this day, La Befana is searching for the little baby. She leaves all the good children toys and candy ("caramelle") or fruit, while the bad children get coal or dark candy ("carbone"), onions or garlic.

Another Christian legend takes a slightly darker tone as La Befana was an ordinary woman with a child whom she greatly loved.  However, her child died, and her resulting grief maddened her.  Upon hearing news of Jesus being born, she set out to see him, delusional that he was her son.  She eventually met Jesus and presented him with gifts to make him happy.  The infant Jesus was delighted, and he gave La Befana a gift in return; she would be the mother of every child in Italy.

Popular tradition tells that if La Befana spots that someone sees her, they will receive a playful thump on the shoulder from her broomstick, as she doesn't wish to be seen.  This aspect of the tradition may be designed to keep children in their beds.

Another commonly heard Christian legend of La Befana starts at the time of the birth of baby Jesus. In this telling, Befana spent her days cleaning and sweeping. One day the magi came to her door in search of the baby Jesus. However, Befana turned them away because she was too busy cleaning. Feeling guilty, she eventually decides to find Jesus on her own by following  a bright light in the sky which she believes points the way. She brings along a bag filled with baked goods and gifts for Jesus, and a broom to help the new mother clean. Unfortunately despite her best efforts she never finds him. According to this telling, Befana is still searching after all these centuries for the new born messiah. On the eve of the Epiphany, Befana comes to every house where there is a child and leaves a gift. Although she has been unsuccessful in her search, she still leaves gifts for children everywhere because the Christ Child can be found in all children.

History

Befana was a widespread tradition among the whole Italian people, having originated in Rome and having  become well known and practiced by the rest of the population during the centuries.

Many people believe that the name Befana is derived from the Italians' mispronunciation of the Greek word epifania or epiphaneia (Greek, επιφάνεια = appearance, surface, English: epiphany). Others point to the name being a derivative of Bastrina, the gifts associated with the goddess Strina.  In the book Domestic Life in Palestine, by Mary E. Rogers (Poe & Hitchcock, 1865) the author notes:

A theory connects the tradition of exchanging gifts to an ancient Roman festivity in honour of Ianus and Strenia (in Italian a Christmas gift used to be called strenna), celebrated at the beginning of the year, when Romans used to give each other presents.

In the book Vestiges of Ancient Manners and Customs, Discoverable in Modern Italy and Sicily   (1823), John J. Blunt  says:

The tradition of Befana appears to incorporate other pre-Christian popular elements as well, adapted to Christian culture and related to the celebration of the New Year. Historian Carlo Ginzburg relates her to Nicnevin. The old lady character should then represent the "old year" just passed, ready to be burned in order to give place to the new one. In many European countries the tradition still exists of burning a puppet of an old lady at the beginning of the New Year, called Giubiana in Northern Italy, with clear Celtic origins. Italian anthropologists Claudia and Luigi Manciocco, in their book Una casa senza porte ("A House without Doors") trace Befana's origins back to Neolithic beliefs and practices.  The team of anthropologists also wrote about Befana as a figure that evolved into a goddess associated with fertility and agriculture.

Befana also maintains many similarities with Perchta and her Pre-Christian Alpine traditions.

The Befana today

The Befana is celebrated throughout all of Italy, and has become a national icon. In the regions of the Marches, Umbria and Latium, her figure is associated with the Papal States, where the Epiphany held the most importance. Urbania is thought to be her official home. Every year there is a big festival held to celebrate the holiday. About 30,000 to 50,000 people attend the festivities. Hundreds of Befanas are present, swinging from the main tower. They juggle, dance and greet all the children.

Traditionally, all Italian children may expect to find a lump of "coal" in their stockings (actually rock candy made black with food coloring), as every child has been at least occasionally bad during the year.

Three places in Italy are nowadays associated with the Befana tradition:

 Piazza Navona in central Rome is the site of a popular market each year between Christmas and the Epiphany, where toys, coal candy, and other candies are on sale. The feast of the Befana in Rome was immortalized in four famous sonnets in the Roman dialect by the 19th century Roman poet Giuseppe Gioacchino Belli.  In Ottorino Respighi's 1928 Feste Romane ("Roman Festivals"), the fourth movement, titled La Befana, is an orchestral portrayal of this Piazza Navona festival. A common superstition is that at midnight when it turns January 6 the Befana shows herself in a window of Piazza Navona, and visitors often go there to observe this.
 The town of Urbania in the Province of Pesaro e Urbino within the Marches, where the national Befana festival is held each year, usually between January 2 and 6. A "house of the Befana" is scheduled to be built and the post office has a mailbox reserved for letters addressed to the Befana, mirroring what happens with Santa Claus in Rovaniemi.
 In Fornovo di Taro, a  town in the  province of Parma, the national meeting "Raduno Nazionale delle Befane e dei Befani" is held on 5 and 6 January.

In other parts of the world where a vibrant Italian community exists, traditions involving Befana may be observed and shared or celebrated with the wider community. In Toronto, Canada for example, a Befana Choir shows up on Winter Solstice each December to sing in the Kensington Market Festival of Lights parade. Women, men, and children dressed in La Befana costume and nose sing love songs to serenade the sun to beckon its return. The singing hags gather in the street to give candy to children, to cackle and screech to accordion music, and to sing in every key imaginable as delighted parade participants join in the cacophony. Sometimes, the Befanas dance with parade goers and dust down the willing as parade goers walk by.

Poems and songs
There are poems about Befana, which are known in slightly different versions throughout Italy. Here is one of the versions:

La Befana vien di notte
Con le scarpe tutte rotte
Col vestito  alla romana
Viva, Viva La Befana!

The English translation is:

The Befana comes by night
With her shoes all tattered and torn
She comes dressed in the Roman way
Long live the Befana!

Another version is given in a poem by Giovanni Pascoli:

Viene, viene la Befana
Vien dai monti a notte fonda
Come è stanca! la circonda 
Neve e gelo e tramontana!
Viene, viene la Befana

The English translation is:

Here comes, here comes the Befana
She comes from the mountains in the deep of the night
Look how tired she is! All wrapped up
In snow and frost and the north wind!  
Here comes, here comes the Befana!

In other media
La freccia azzurra, 1996 animated film, released in the US as How the Toys Saved Christmas.
The Italian-language Christmas fantasy comedy film The Legend of the Christmas Witch, was released on December 27, 2018. The Italian-Spanish co-production was directed by Michele Soavi and features a 500-year-old Befana who works as a schoolteacher by day.
The Disney+ Christmas miniseries The Santa Clauses featured Befana played by Laura San Giacomo.

See also
Epiphany (holiday)
Knecht Ruprecht
Krampus
Perchta
Père Fouettard
Saint Nicholas Day
Zwarte Piet

References

External links

Befana, an academic view 
The story of the befana and letters and pictures by children

Christmas characters
Christmas in Italy
Female legendary creatures
Italian folklore
Witchcraft in folklore and mythology
Witchcraft in Italy
Hags
Christmas gift-bringers